Richard Michael St. Clair (born September 2, 1953 in Cleveland, Ohio) is a former professional American football player who played defensive end for seven seasons for the Cleveland Browns and the Cincinnati Bengals, and later in the USFL for the San Antonio Gunslingers.

1953 births
Living people
Players of American football from Cleveland
American football defensive ends
Grambling State Tigers football players
Cleveland Browns players
Cincinnati Bengals players
San Antonio Gunslingers players